The New Vision is a Ugandan English-language newspaper published daily in print form and online.

Overview
New Vision is one of two main national English-language newspapers in Uganda, the other being the Daily Monitor. It is published by the Vision Group, which has its head office on First Street, in the Industrial Area of Kampala, Uganda's capital and largest city in that East African country.

History
It was established in its current form in 1986 by the Ugandan government. It was founded in 1955 as the Uganda Argus, a British colonial government publication. Between 1962 and 1971, the first Obote government kept the name of its daily publication as Uganda Argus. Following the rise to power of Idi Amin in 1971, the government paper was renamed Voice of Uganda. When Amin was deposed in 1979, the second Obote government named its paper Uganda Times. When the National Resistance Movement seized power in 1986, the name of the daily newspaper was changed to New Vision. The Uganda Argus and its successors always presented as the "official" newspaper of the government in power.

Vision Group

The Vision Group incorporated as the New Vision Printing & Publishing Company Limited (NVPPCL), started business in March 1986. It is a multimedia business conglomerate, that publishes newspapers, magazines and internet content. It also owns television stations, radio stations for which it provides some original programming. In addition, NVPPCL carries out commercial printing and advertising. NVPPCL is listed on the Uganda Securities Exchange, where it trades under the symbol NVL.

Leadership 
On 12 October 2006, William Pike, chief executive officer (CEO) of the newspaper, resigned followed by editor-in-chief David Sseppuuya less than two weeks later. Pike had a long history with the paper, starting there as a sports journalist 19 years before. Pike was largely credited with maintaining a degree of editorial independence for the newspaper. It was reported in 2006 that "press freedom in Uganda might be in jeopardy",and that Pike was being "forced to resign apparently at the behest of President Yoweri Kaguta Museveni".

Pike's departure was followed by the appointment of Ugandan government spokesman Robert Kabushenga as CEO. As of July 2014, Kabushenga was still the CEO.

In late November 2006, Belgian journalist and activist Els de Temmerman became editor-in-chief after receiving written guarantees of her editorial independence. She resigned her post on 24 October 2008, stating "I have concluded that I can no longer count on the assurances I received when I accepted the job and so I must resign". In February 2009, Els de Temmerman returned as the editor-in-chief after a four-month absence. She resigned for the final time in mid April 2010, making room for her deputy, Barbara Kaija, who was formally appointed as the editor-in-chief.

See also
 Media in Uganda
 List of newspapers in Uganda

References

External links
Website of the New Vision Newspaper
List of Online Newspapers In Uganda
New Vision Uganda Info

Daily newspapers published in Uganda
Newspapers established in 1986
1986 establishments in Uganda
Mass media in Kampala